Åke Gustav "Plutten" Andersson (8 June 1918 – 11 May 1982) was a Swedish ice hockey, football and bandy player and manager, known for representing Hammarby IF in all three sports.

He represented his country at two Winter Olympic games, finishing fourth in 1948 and winning a bronze medal in 1952. He was the captain of the Swedish national team from 1945 until his retirement in 1954.

Early life
Andersson grew up in a working-class home in a southern part of Stockholm known as Södermalm. His father was working as a groundskeeper at Hammarby Idrottsplats, the home of local club Hammarby IF which he joined at age 14.

Athletic career

Ice hockey
In 1934, Andersson started to play hockey with Hammarby IF in Elitserien, Sweden's top tier.

He won six Swedish championships – in 1936, 1937, 1942, 1943, 1946 and 1951 – with the club. In total, Andersson made 351 competitive appearances for Hammarby, scoring 150 goals. He played 23 seasons in the Swedish top league, a domestic record.

He was known as a hard-working player with a lot of stamina, possessing a good tactical mind and a great sense of play. He was also good at positioning himself and had good offensive qualities. Andersson was, among other awards and prizes, crowned as "Sweden's best hockey player" seven years in a row. Andersson formed a strong defensive pairing with the physical defenceman Rune Johansson for several seasons.

Andersson decided to stay with Hammarby during his whole career, even though he had frequent offers from other teams in Sweden. About his love for Hammarby, Andersson said the following in November 1957:

He won 62 competitive caps for the Swedish national team, scoring a total of 18 goals, and regularly captained the side. Andersson represented his country at six major tournaments, and his biggest achievements were winning the bronze medal in the 1952 Winter Olympics and Sweden's first ever World Championship win in 1953.

He is a recipient of the honorary award Stora Grabbars Märke and was inducted into the Swedish Hockey Hall of Fame in 2012; both awards are handed out by the Swedish Ice Hockey Association. In total, he made 134 appearances for Sweden, including friendlies and exhibition matches, between 1937 and 1954.

Andersson retired from hockey at the end of 1958, at age 40, due to a fracture. He was the head coach of Hammarby between 1960 and 1962.

Football
In 1937, at age 19, Andersson debuted in the senior football team of Hammarby IF. Up until 1951, Andersson made 231 league appearances for Hammarby, mostly in the Swedish second tier Division 2, scoring 40 goals, playing as a midfielder.

In 1939–40, Hammarby competed for one season in Allsvenskan, the domestic top league, with Andersson playing 13 of 22 fixtures, but was relegated immediately.

He was the player-manager of Hammarby for one season in 1950–51 together with Folke Adamsson, after which he decided to retire from football.

Bandy
Andersson was also a prominent bandy player for Hammarby IF between 1932 and 1947. He was a member of the Swedish national team and won a total of seven caps for his country. As well as in ice hockey, Andersson is a recipient of the honorary award Stora Grabbars Märke in bandy, an award that is handed out by the Swedish Bandy Association.

Personal life
He was the younger brother of Stig Emanuel Andersson, who also was a celebrated sportsman. His nephew Börje Andersson also played hockey and made one season with Hammarby IF in 1968–69.

References 

1918 births
1982 deaths
Ice hockey people from Stockholm
Ice hockey players at the 1948 Winter Olympics
Ice hockey players at the 1952 Winter Olympics
Olympic bronze medalists for Sweden
Olympic ice hockey players of Sweden
Swedish bandy players
Swedish footballers
Swedish football managers
Olympic medalists in ice hockey
Medalists at the 1952 Winter Olympics
Hammarby Hockey (1921–2008) players
Hammarby IF Bandy players
Hammarby Fotboll managers
Hammarby Fotboll players
Allsvenskan players
Association footballers not categorized by position